Andreu Linares Rodríguez (born 24 February 1975) is a former Spanish futsal player, best known for his spell with Inter Movistar as a flank / pivot.

Honours

Club
5 Spanish Championship winner (2000/01, 2002/03, 2003/04, 2004/05, 2007/08)
4 Spanish Supercup winner (1998/99, 2001/02, 2005/06, 2007/08)
3 Spanish Cup winner (03/04, 04/05, 06/07)
4 Intercontinental Cup winner (2005, 2006, 2007, 2008)
2 Copa Iberica winner (2003/04, 2005/06)
1 Recopa de Europa (2008)
3 UEFA Futsal Cup winner (2001, 2004, 2006)

Spain
"4 Nations Tournament" winner (1996 and 1997)
FIFA Trophy (1999, 2001)
FIFA World Futsal Championship (2004) Winner
FIFA Futsal World Championship (2008) runner-up
UEFA Futsal Championship (2005, 2007) Winner
UEFA Futsal Championship (1999) runner-up

Individual
Best left flank of LNFS (1999/00 and 2000/01)
Best young player of LNFS (1996/97)

External links
FutsalPlanet.com
LNFS.es

1975 births
Living people
Sportspeople from Barcelona
Spanish men's futsal players
Inter FS players
Playas de Castellón FS players
Caja Segovia FS players
FC Barcelona Futsal players